The 52nd Annual Country Music Association Awards, commonly known as the 52nd CMA Awards, were held on November 14, 2018, at the Bridgestone Arena in Nashville, Tennessee and was hosted for the eleventh time by CMA Award winners Brad Paisley and Carrie Underwood.

Winners and nominees
The nominations for the 52nd CMA Awards were announced on August 28, 2018, on Good Morning America by Luke Bryan, Dan + Shay and Sugarland.

The winners are shown in Bold.

Performers

Presenters

Reception 
Underwood and Pasley's monologue was praised for ignoring the subject of politics, with Fox News stating that "despite avoiding controversial topics, Underwood and Paisley still delivered a joke-filled opening monologue that left many in the audience in stitches".

In their review of the best and worst moments of the telecast, The Washington Post praised Stapleton's performance with Morris and Staples, Brooks' "sweet" and "adorable" tribute to Trisha Yearwood, Bryan's opening number, the "fiery" Pistol Annies performance and the Ricky Skaggs tribute and celebrated Musgraves' Album of the Year win as well as the performances on newer artists such as Combs and Dan + Shay. However, they were critical of Paisley and Underwood's monologue, calling it "flat", "lame" and claiming that it "didn't make sense", leaving audience members "confused". Lauren Alaina's tribute to Dottie West was criticised for being too short and Midland's tribute to Burt Reynolds was described as being too confusing and unexplained.

References 

Country Music Association
CMA
Country Music Association Awards
Country Music Association Awards
November 2018 events in the United States
2018 awards in the United States
21st century in Nashville, Tennessee
Events in Nashville, Tennessee